Henry Pelham (fl. 1640s) was an English lawyer and politician  who sat in the House of Commons  between 1621 and 1648. He was Speaker of the English House of Commons for a short time in 1647.

Pelham was the son of Sir William Pelham, of Brocklesby, Lincolnshire. He matriculated at Trinity College, Cambridge at Easter 1615 and was admitted at Gray's Inn on 6 November 1616.

Pelham was elected Member of Parliament for Grimsby  in 1621 and was re-elected in 1625, 1626 and 1628. He sat until 1629, when King Charles decided to rule without parliament for eleven years.

In April 1640, Pelham was elected MP for Grantham in the Short Parliament. He was re-elected MP for Grantham for the Long Parliament in November 1640. He was Grand Chamberlain from 1640 to 1648. He held the post of Speaker for a short time in 1647, when William Lenthall temporarily fled from London.

Pelham was Recorder of Lincoln until his resignation in 1658.

References

Austin Woolrych Soldiers and Statesmen

 
 

Year of birth unknown
Year of death unknown
English MPs 1621–1622
English MPs 1625
English MPs 1626
English MPs 1628–1629
English MPs 1640 (April)
Speakers of the House of Commons of England
Alumni of Trinity College, Cambridge
Members of Gray's Inn
Members of the Parliament of England for Great Grimsby